Jan Frederik Hulswit (April 9, 1885 – May 2, 1932) was a Dutch water polo player who competed in the 1908 Summer Olympics.

Hulswit was born in Apeldoorn.  He was a member of the Dutch water polo team which finished fourth in the 1908 tournament.

He died in Willemstad, Netherlands Antilles.

References

External links
Jan Hulswit at Sports-reference.com

1885 births
1932 deaths
Dutch male water polo players
Water polo players at the 1908 Summer Olympics
Olympic water polo players of the Netherlands
Sportspeople from Apeldoorn
20th-century Dutch people